Richard Stanford (dates of birth and death unknown) was an English cricketer. Stanford's batting style is unknown.  He was christened at East Lavant, Sussex on 27 May 1804.

Stanford made a single first-class appearance for Sussex in 1832 against an England XI at the Royal New Ground, Brighton. In a match which Sussex won by 5 wickets, Stanford batted once, scoring an unbeaten 5 runs in Sussex's first-innings. He also caught Henry Beagley in the England XI's second-innings.

References

External links
Richard Stanford at ESPNcricinfo
Richard Stanford at CricketArchive

People from Lavant, West Sussex
Year of death missing
Year of birth missing
Place of death missing
English cricketers
Sussex cricketers
English cricketers of 1826 to 1863